The Revival Tour was the second solo concert tour by American singer Selena Gomez, in support of her second solo studio album Revival (2015). The tour began in Las Vegas, Nevada at the Mandalay Bay Events Center on May 6, 2016, and concluded in Auckland, New Zealand at the Vector Arena on August 13, 2016.

Background and development 
On October 1, 2015, Gomez announced that she would be begin touring North America in late spring of the following year in support of her album Revival (2015). When discussing the tour in a video posted to her fans on Instagram, Gomez stated:
I have a very exciting announcement:  I am launching my Revival World Tour. I will be going through the US and Canada from May to July and then later in the year going overseas.
She also announced that fans could purchase a Revival bundle with early ticket access.
In a statement to Entertainment Weekly, Gomez stated:
I am ready to get back on the road and see my fans in person! This album marks a new and very important chapter in my life. I cannot wait to get on stage and perform this new material.

The first leg took place in North America across the United States and Canada. The leg ran from May to July 2016. DNCE served as the main opening act in North America with the exception of Vancouver, Winnipeg, Ottawa, and Anaheim. Bea Miller opened from May 6, 2016 through June 15, 2016 and July 9, 2016, Tyler Shaw opened in Vancouver, Winnipeg, and Ottawa, Bahari opened from June 17, 2016 through July 8, 2016, and Charlie Puth opened in Anaheim. On March 15, 2016, Quebec City Summer Festival 2016 announced Gomez as a main headliner of the festival in Quebec City.

The second leg took place across Asia. Announcements for the Asia leg was announced through each city individually rather than one big announcement. The leg ran from July 23, 2016 through August 3, 2016. Opening acts included Gentle Bones in Singapore, Jai Waetford in Bangkok, Darren Espanto in Manila, and DNCE returning as an opening act in Tokyo. Gomez was scheduled to perform her very first shows in China, but reports came out that she was allegedly banned by Chinese authorities due to support of Dalai Lama. The third leg took place across Oceania. The leg ran from August 6, 2016 through August 13, 2016. DNCE returned once again as the opening act for Oceania.

Gomez had plans to tour across Europe and Latin America, but cancelled, citing anxiety and depression caused by lupus.

Set list 
This set list is representative of the show on July 5, 2016 in Phoenix. It is not representative of all concerts for the duration of the tour.

 "Revival"
 "Same Old Love"
 "Come & Get It"
 "Sober"
 "Good for You"
 "Survivors"
 "Slow Down"
 "Love You like a Love Song"
 "Hands to Myself"
 "Who Says"
 "Transfiguration" / "Nobody"
 "Feel Me"
 "Me & My Girls" 
 "Me & the Rhythm"
 "Body Heat"
 "Sweet Dreams (Are Made of This)" 
 "Kill Em With Kindness"
 "I Want You to Know"
 "Revival" (remix)

Notes 
 During the show in Miami, Gomez dedicated "Transfiguration" and "Nobody" to Christina Grimmie. Grimmie died on June 10, 2016, of gunshot wounds inflicted in an attack following her concert performance in Orlando.
 During the show in New Orleans, Gomez dedicated "Transfiguration" to the victims affected by the 2016 Orlando nightclub shooting.
 During the show in Anaheim, Charlie Puth joined Gomez to perform "We Don't Talk Anymore".

Shows

Cancelled shows

References

Notes

Citations 

2016 concert tours
Selena Gomez concerts